Vitthalbhai Patel (21 May 1936 – 7 September 2013) was an Indian poet, lyricist, and senior Congress leader known for his contributions in social services and politics as well as for penning several Hindi film songs, including "Na Maangu Sona Chaandi" and "Jhooth Bole Kauva Kaate" from the 1973 movie Bobby.

He was from Sagar, Madhya Pradesh, India where he lived most of his life. He wrote in Hindi and Bundeli.

He died on 7 September 2013 after a prolonged illness. He was 75.

Patel was twice elected to the Madhya Pradesh Legislative Assembly from Surkhi constituency. He was a minister in the cabinets of Arjun Singh, Motilal Vora and Shyama Charan Shukla.

Patel wrote the lyrics to 55 Hindi film songs, as well as five collections of poems.

References

2013 deaths
1939 births
Indian male songwriters
20th-century Indian musicians
People from Sagar, Madhya Pradesh
Indian National Congress politicians
Madhya Pradesh MLAs 1980–1985
Madhya Pradesh MLAs 1985–1990